Phillip Andrew "Phil" Roper (born 24 January 1992) is an English field hockey player who plays as a midfielder or forward for Dutch club Oranje-Rood in the Dutch Hoofdklasse and the England and Great Britain national teams.

Club career
Roper joined Dutch club Oranje-Rood for the 2021–22 season, for at least two seasons.

He previously played club hockey in the Men's England Hockey League Premier Division for Wimbledon.

He started playing hockey, aged 8, for his local club Chester HC and played there for ten years before going to university, where he played for Sheffield Hallam.

International career
Roper made his international debut in 2013. He competed for England in the men's hockey tournament at the 2014 Commonwealth Games where he won a bronze medal. On 24 May 2017 he was named as one of a three-man captaincy group, for England and Great Britain. It was a new captaincy structure for the men's international teams. On 28 May 2021, he was selected in the England squad for the 2021 EuroHockey Championship.

References

External links

1992 births
Living people
Sportspeople from Chester
Male field hockey midfielders
Male field hockey forwards
Commonwealth Games bronze medallists for England
English male field hockey players
Field hockey players at the 2014 Commonwealth Games
Field hockey players at the 2018 Commonwealth Games
2018 Men's Hockey World Cup players
Commonwealth Games medallists in field hockey
Wimbledon Hockey Club players
Men's England Hockey League players
Field hockey players at the 2020 Summer Olympics
Olympic field hockey players of Great Britain
HC Oranje-Rood players
Men's Hoofdklasse Hockey players
2023 Men's FIH Hockey World Cup players
Medallists at the 2014 Commonwealth Games
Medallists at the 2018 Commonwealth Games